is a 1951 black-and-white Japanese film directed by Koji Shima.  The movie is based on Lisa and Lottie, a 1949 novel by Erich Kästner later adapted as the 1961 film The Parent Trap.

Cast 
 Hibari Misora
 So Yamamura
 Mitsuko Mito
 Satsuki Arakawa
 Kyōji Sugi
 Shinshō Kokontei
 Jun Miyazaki
 Hikaru Hoshi
 Mantarō Ushio

See also
 List of films in the public domain in the United States

References

External links 

Japanese black-and-white films
1951 films
Films based on Lottie and Lisa
Films directed by Koji Shima
Fictional twins
Daiei Film films
Japanese comedy films
1951 comedy films
1950s Japanese films